Sijo is a Korean traditional poetic form that emerged in the Goryeo period, flourished during the Joseon Dynasty, and is still written today. Bucolic, metaphysical, and cosmological themes are often explored. The three lines average 14–16 syllables, for a total of 42–48: theme (3, 4,4,4); elaboration (3,4,4,4); counter-theme (3,5) and completion (4,3).

Sijo may be narrative or thematic and introduces a situation in line 1, development in line 2, and twist and conclusion in line 3. The first half of the final line employs a "twist": a surprise of meaning, sound, or other device. Sijo is often more lyrical and personal than other East Asian poetic forms, and the final line can take a profound turn. Yet, "The conclusion of sijo is seldom epigrammatic or witty; a witty close to a sentence would have been foreign to the genius of stylized Korean diction in the great sijo periods."

Structure

Elements of early sijo 
P’yong sijo prioritized its grammatical structure for recitation purposes and not writing; so, this made the “rules” of sijo structure quite strict. Authors were mostly of the higher up yangban social class and emphasized how their sijo would be sung melodically first as opposed to written down later. This meant that the rhythmic pattern in these sijos had to be learned exactly to be considered a truthful recitation. 

Tang poetry was traditionally rhythmically segmented in its stanzas. This feature was one that was passed down onto p’yong sijo as well as other early forms of sijo. Sijo poems often follow a rhythmic structure characterized by the syllabic ways of Chinese and Hangul characters. Specifically, they follow a 3-4-3-4, 3-4-3-4, 3-5-4-3 rhythmic structure per line. An example of the strictness of early sijo is seen especially in their third lines. It sticks hard to the “3-5” syllable rule at the beginning of the third line. This is done so to further drive the rhetorical conclusion of the sijo. As David McCann puts it, syllabic counting plays “a role in patterns of syllable distribution among the four phrases or syllable groups that constitute the lines [of a sijo].”  Furthermore, since most p’yong sijo was not titled and was often spread mostly through recitation, its structure was much more specific and defined than the sijo forms we would see later down the line.

Elements of developed sijo 
There are many variants of sijo, ranging from the standard three-line p’yong sijo to the slightly expanded ossijo and the greatly expanded narrative sasol sijo. The conventional structure of p’yong sijo consists of three lines, with each line broken by a caesura (a midline pause) into two halves. Each hemistich (or half) is further broken into pairs. As a result, there are four groups total in one line. A single group is typically made up of three to five syllables, which results in a composition of approximately forty five syllables (morae). However, these syllabic distributions are the average; variation in syllable count is the rule, not an exception. Sijo is an accentual verse form, not syllabic. A group generally corresponds to syntactic and rhythmic units and can be distinguished by mutual contrast, such as particles or verb endings. All traditional sijo were originally set to melodies that impose further regularity and cadence to each poem.

The table above illustrates that deviations from the traditional syllabic distribution occur fairly frequently, depending on the position. For example, there are 13 times that group I in line 1 has a syllable count other than 3. In contrast, the ends of the first two lines, as well as groups I and III in the third line, show very little variation. The greater regularity in these positions is directly related to the variation that precedes or follows; the increased regularity ensures the rhythm is not lost.

Elements of modern sijo 
In contrast to the structure of early sijo forms such as p’yong sijo, modern sijo sticks mainly to a freer and more fluid way of writing. This is a controversial take amongst the sijo community as some argue that modern sijo focuses “on the revival of sijo, but claim that its traditional fixed form cannot be preserved." Thus, there has been a large wave of people who subscribe to the thought that modern sijo can be written without attention to rhythmic segments and the fixed form. Thus, many modern poets and artists write free-verse works and still claim them as sijo. In Oh’s work, the author states that “​​sijo, even a contemporary one, which does not obey the form, cannot be considered sijo." This has left modern sijo at a divide between those who choose to honor the strictness of fixed form sijo and those who believe an adaptive free-form version of the poetic genre may still be acceptable as traditional works. Despite the fact that early forms, such as p’yong sijo, were not as widely written and recorded, they would still follow a 3-4-3-4, 3-4-3-4, 3-5-4-3 rhythmic structure. This made them strong and strict forms of poetry that only skilled artists would be able to remember and recite. This is changed in modern sijo. Since modern sijo is first written and not as spread through word of mouth, its structure has become much more lenient and differs in its shape across different authors.

Early sijo in the Goryeo dynasty 
Although sijo gained much of its popularity in the Joseon dynasty, it is important to note that the roots of the sijo are attributed to the late Goryeo dynasty. In fact, the earliest existing sijo was found to have been written towards the end of the 14th century as Confucian scholars sought to overcome the existing Buddhist-dominated literary, music, and art forms. As a result, there are important differences between the sijo written at the end of the Goryeo dynasty and those written in the Joseon dynasty. The sijo of the times, mostly written by men of elite status, are very reflective of the contemporary politics; thus, to understand the importance of the themes of Goryeo dynasty sijo, it is important to understand the political climate surrounding the poetry.

Much of the Goryeo dynasty was plagued with political strife. In 1170, the military aristocracy seized power from the civil aristocracy. Instability reigned in the government and the countryside for the next 25 years as military leaders plotted against each other and peasants rebelled against landowners and local officers. It was not until 1196 that things stabilized, when Choe Chung-heon seized power and established rule of the Choe family. Much of his power came from the parallel government he created, which was based on house institutions under his direct control staffed with people personally loyal to him. He also made effective use of mun'gaek, private military retainers of great clans.

Korea then endured repeated Mongol invasions from 1217 to 1258, and from 1270 to 1356, Korea was under Mongol domination. After Korea was liberated from Mongol control, there were still political conflicts on all sides of Goryeo. Goryeo was consistently under attack from Japanese pirates and Yuan refugees and faced two invasions from the Red Turbans. Finally, the Goryeo dynasty ended when Yi Seong-gye rose to power, proclaiming himself as King Taejo and renaming the state as the Joseon. This transition was quite violent and unstable, as the crown princes and members of the Wang royal house were reinstated only to be purged, and two factions arose towards the later Goryeo era – one whose loyalty to the existing regime continued, another whose loyalty shifted towards the new movement of the Joseon.

It was this incident for which the sijo poems of the late Goryeo are most well-known. The most prevalent theme of this era is loyalty to a lost cause, arising as a reaction to the rise of the new Joseon dynasty as the most powerful groups of the period struggled with where their loyalties lay. However, exacerbating the situation were the simultaneous struggles of China's Sung dynasty and the ascending Ming dynasty, further conflicting the people's loyalties. Thus, the ensuing confusion and chaos of the times gave way to themes of strong emotions such as regret over aging and sorrow over love, as many sought to express their mixed, complicated thoughts and harken back to the time of peace and stability.

One of the most famous sijo poems that demonstrates such political upheavals and tensions of the period is Chŏng Mongju's sijo, seen below, with the English translation:

Chŏng, a great scholar of the time referred to as P'oŭn, supposedly wrote this poem in response to Yi Seong-gye's son's suggestion to defect and join the growing Joseon movement.  The very idea that one's "undivided heart" remains loyal to the same despite dying "a hundred times" and one's "bleached bones all turn(ing) to dust" clearly exhibits the overall sense of honor, integrity, and fidelity that is emblematic of this generation's sijo poetry. In fact, this poem has become one of the prototypical examples of loyalty in Korea, even possibly one of the best known of all Korean sijo poems among Koreans. Today, this sijo has become to be known as the "Song of a Loyal Heart," or the "Tansim ka."

Reemergence in the 18th century 
Sijo was first written in the 14th century during the end of the Goryeo dynasty. However, it was not until the Joseon dynasty that it gained immense popularity. During the rise of the early Joseon dynasty sijo became very popular among yangban and the ruling class. In its earlier stages sijo was often written in classical Chinese by yangban and the ruling class. A lot of the poems used language which showed social hierarchy. It was not accessible to the masses due to it being written in classical Chinese characters. It was also hard to adapt to sijo-chang (sijo in song form) because of the Chinese characters.

The 18th century marked two very important events in sijo. The first being the reemergence of the term. The second being the shift from classical or traditional sijo to modern sijo. During the 18th century, the word sijo reemerged and with it came changes. Sijo was now written in Korean and was more accessible to the masses. It was no longer confined to just being a product by and for the ruling class and the yangban. Sijo was now available, created and performed by the general Korean public. New poems outside of Confucian ideal and hierarchy were being written and performed. This led to the invention of different forms of sijo such as sasol sijo, and yon sijo. The themes of sijo expanded and included more than just the narrative of the upper class.

In early to mid 18th century sijo reemerged and can be seen as traditional sijo. This is mainly due to the fact that this period signified Korea's isolation to the outside world. After the Treaty of Ganghwa which opened Korea to a foreign nation, Sijo also shifted to become a modern poetry form. Up until the end of the Joseon dynasty, there was not a singular name for this form of poetry and sijo was not considered a literary genre. Instead, they were seen as songs and were labeled to signify what type of song it was. For example, it would have names such as sijoelga or sijeoldanga due to the situation in which it was a sung source. It was not until late 18th century that the word "sijo" reemerged as a literary poetic genre. It was in the 19th century that the movement of the restoration of sijo began. The activists involved in that movement took the first part of the word sijochang which historically was sung and kept the word as "sijo" to define this literary genre.

Sijo chang 
Sijo emerged in the late Goryeo Period as a performing art and eventually gained popularity through the Joseon period. Initially, it spread amongst the yangban, or upper class, and later amongst the commoners. Sijo was passed down as an oral tradition during this period as a means to preserve the art form. While sijo encompasses a wide variety of traditional Korean poetry, one specific variation that derives from it is known as sijo chang. One of the most significant differences when comparing standard sijo with sijo chang is the presence of musical instruments. Sijo chang poetry employs the use of various Korean instruments to accompany the vocalist reciting the poem.

Sijo chang is known as "short song" because it has slow tunes with long, drawn-out ending pronunciation. For this reason it may also be called "the slowest song in the world". It demands a high level of ability and coordination between drummer and performer in order to keep the song flowing well. Throughout each sijo, the singer employs practiced techniques, such as vibrato and pitch changes.

The singer is accompanied by the daegeum (bamboo flute) and the janggu (hour-glass shaped drum). The singer uses a wide range of vibrato in addition to pitch changes. All sijo chang are sung in a very deliberate pace. The singer must be trained to extend the notes of the song for effect.  Other instruments are used as the background musical support to keep the flow. For instance, the piri (bamboo oboe), daegeum (transverse flute), danso (vertical flute), and haegeum (two-fiddle zither) may also be used to accompany the vocalist. Although a wide variety of instruments may be used as an accompaniment to the sijo chang vocalist, not all may be used at one time. In more informal settings the janggu may be used as the sole instrument. Oftentimes, the sound of hitting one's lap may also serve as the only instrumental accompaniment.

Similarities with Tang poetry in themes and expression of emotion 

There are many similarities between Korean sijo poetry and Chinese Tang poetry: the reason that people wrote poems, the messages that they want to deliver, and how they express their feelings by talking about natural things. The following passage shows the translation of Kwon Homun's "The Wind is Pure and Clear":

There are only wind, moon, pine, lute and books in the poem. However, Kwon Homun used these to paint a world of himself that he dreams of. For him, a simple life like this is enough, but even this seemly simple life is hard for him to realize. Similarly, Chinese poets in the Tang dynasty also wrote poems in this way and for this reason. Here is the translation of Li Bai's "At the Yellow Crane Tower to Bid Meng Haoran Bon Voyage":

On the surface, this poem is about the view and the landscape that Li Bai saw while he was in the tower of yellow crane superficially, but it actually expresses the deep feeling of Li Bai when he was still gazing at the river even though his friend Meng Haoran has left. The first line gives readers the background and the second line constructs a confused and sorrowful air. In the last two lines, it describes how Li Bai gazed after Meng Haoran and how he felt, metaphorizing his feelings as the Long River.

By comparing the meanings of these two poems, we know that both Korean sijo and Chinese Tang poetry often employ natural objects such as landscape, pines, bamboo, plants and flowers in order to express human emotions.

Authors

Kisaeng 
The Kisaeng were women who functioned as professional entertainers, performing artists, and courtesans. These women were selected at a young age from the lower class for their beauty and talents; then trained to work for the government performing-arts bureaucracy. Their presence as poets that contributed to the art of sijo is notable due to their position as lower class women. They were considered barely above beggars due to their association with prostitution. Since the Joseon period was heavily influenced by Confucianist ideals, social stratification was heavily enforced. Kisaengs ability to create artwork admired by the yangban—upper class men—was remarkable.

Many scholars note that the sijos written by kisaeng contain "a rare blend of emotional freedom, ironic perspective, and technical mastery" because they were free of the shackles of societal expectations. Their lower class standing released them from having to conform to themes of nature or filial piety. Therefore, despite the fact that the number of kisaeng authored sijo is unknown, their work is heavily associated with love poetry. Hwang Jini is one of the most notable kisaeng poets along with Yi Maechang.

In film 
The title of the 2016 film Love, Lies in English refers to a famous sijo:

This follows the "classic format" of the three line structure and love-longing content. The title of the film literally means 'flowers that understand words', which refers to a kisaeng's ability to understand the desire or need of men. The film gives clear facts on the connection between sijo and kisaeng. It also shows how kisaengs train from a very young age, and how they performed sijo chang.

Hwang Jin Yi, a 2007 film, gives an introduction to the well-known kisaeng Hwang Jin Yi, and her legendary life.  The film examples give a clear view and introduction about kisaeng. Also, in these films, there is clear description of the well-educated kisaengs' accomplishments in literature. As one of the two classes who contributed to the composition the sijo poems, kisaeng also leave numbers of memorable sijo poems.

Kim Chŏnt'aek 

Kim Chŏnt'aek was a prolific writer of sijo poetry and a famous singer. Scholars are almost certain that he was born in the late 1680s. In 1728 he created the first of the great sijo anthologies, 청구영언(靑丘永言), "Chanted Words of the Green Hills." It is one of the oldest surviving sijo anthologies. Kim Chŏnt'aek was considered the best singer musician in the country. Kim Chŏnt'aek did well in music, but he had also mastered the art of poetry. In particular, he composed sijo about the conflict between ranks in society, informed by his own middle-class perspective. He also wrote around thirty sijo with themes of nature, with subjects such as rivers and mountains. 

One of Kim Chŏnt'aek’s poems is as follows:

흰구름 푸른 내는 골골이 잠겼는데

추풍에 물든 단풍 봄꽃도곤 더 좋왜라 

천공이 나를 위하여 뫼빛을 꾸며내도다

The blue hazy mountain sees from far away

Autumn leaves are more beautiful than spring flowers

God creates a colorful mountain for me.

This work can be seen as being based on the sense of pleasure and satisfaction of bringing nature into one's own world. While taking advantage of the harmonious colorful beauty of the two colors, the poet glorifies the feeling of being immersed in the beauty of nature. In reading, one can feel relaxed and assimilated into the natural space of the world as a spiritual object. 

Kim Chŏnt'aek's significance in Korean literature can be seen through Confucian compilations of poetry collections. He had great achievements in the world of literature and sijo. First, Kim Chŏnt'aek helped to transfer the lead role in writing sijo from the scholar yangban class to the commoners. Second, his compilation 청구영언 is notable, not only because Kim Chŏnt'aek was not a yangban, but because it was one of the first sijo compilations. Finally, his vigorous creativity helped contribute to the development and cultivation of a new generation of sijo poems. Additionally, Kim Chŏnt'aek recognized the Korean written language (한글). While he used Chinese characters in creating the 청구영언 and in his works commenting on other poems, he did not use them extensively in his usual verses.

Sasol sijo 
The sasol sijo, an expanded form of the pyeong sijo that originated in the Goryeo dynasty, became popular in the 18th century.  The word sasol means "close-stitched" or "closely set" and sasol sijo simply means "chatty" or "narrative" sijo. Sasol sijo loosely observed the basic format of sijo: fifteen-syllable lines for the first, second, and last lines. However, its middle section was expanded by adding additional phrases. During this time, most writers of sasol sijo took an interest in the life of the commoners. The writers of sasol sijo include women, yangban, chungin (the upper-middle class), and commoners. The authors tended to write in a manner that was more down to earth, and often rough and comical. Due to the themes relating to a commoner's ordinary life, most of the writers of sasol sijo remained anonymous. There has been speculation made about their anonymity, which could possibly be because of their humbleness to not have their names remembered. Furthermore, sasol sijo is significant in terms of how it changed the structure of sijo. However, it is not a form that is still used today.

Themes varied between pyeong sijo and sasol sijo. As pyeong sijo was created in the Goryeo Dynasty (918–1392), many Buddhist values could be seen in early pyeong sijo. Then, in the Joseon Dynasty (1392–1910), the upper class in Korea upheld Confucian values. Meanwhile, sasol sijo was written about common life and didn't uphold the expectations of Confucianism. There was an increase in the number of works focusing on love, whether that was carnal love, love-sickness, etc. Traditional pyeong sijo avoided discussing sex or love in this manner. Additionally, sasol sijo tended to include sarcasm, humor, and rough language associated with the common people.

While themes differ between sasol sijo and pyeong sijo, the most obvious difference between the two is their structure. Like pyeong sijo, sasol sijo consists of three lines, where the first line introduces the topic, the second line expands on the topic, and the third line provides a twist or a neat conclusion. In sasol sijo, the first and second lines are much longer compared to the three lines in regular sijo. If only one line of sijo is expanded, it is called os sijo meaning "slightly altered sijo". More than one line expanded is sasol sijo and usually, the last line maintains the original structure of the last line in pyeong sijo and begins with a 3-syllable unit. Not having a fixed limit to the length of the sasol sijo meant that it is the content that directs the form and not the form that directs the content. This allows an unruly play of words and images. Below is an example of sasol sijo:

Modern sijo

Emergence of modern sijo

There are two established developments of sijo: before 1876 and after. Before 1876 was when traditional sijo was prevalent and after 1876 modern sijo was "so-called" created (p. 25). Sijo is a genre of short Korean poems with a strictly defined structure reflecting the rhythm of a traditional Korean song known as pansori. It originated from Korea in the Koryǒ dynasty which began to flourish in the Joseon dynasty. Established with the Confucian ideology, sijo became the most popular type of poetry among the ruling Confucian scholars and noblemen. During the time, sijo was sung and recorded by word of mouth or transcribed. Sijo is an official name of the genre of poems, which came to be in the period of modernism; especially after a movement for the restoration of sijo that became active in the 19th century. The activists of the movement copied the first part of the name of the music sijo chang as the term to reference the poetry as it did not previously have a name.

Structure and comparison to traditional sijo

Modern sijo is a further developed upon and expanded category of Korean vernacular poetry also known as sijo. The original style that was developed and used prior to the 20th century is referred to as p’yǒng sijo. This new style first emerged during 'The open-door period' (개화기) (1876) and continued on to flourish during The Empire of Korea (1897–1910), Japanese Colonial Period (1910–1945), and even still is written today. It refers only to the written form. Modern sijo is generally structured the same as p’yǒng sijo with three line poems consisting of various amounts of syllables per foot. However, there are still several key differences between the two. The first being that modern sijo all have titles whereas none of the p’yǒng sijo did. Also given that sijo creation and literature in general was exclusive to the yangban class, p’yǒng sijo often used a lot of references to Chinese classics as well as focusing on the rhythm that it would be sung to as they were originally songs that were written down later on. Modern sijo was the product of literature becoming more widespread and available to the populace so it became filled with more wit, humor, and everyday life experiences. The rhythm also was not fixed as they were not focused on the performance aspect as it originally was. Instead of using Chinese characters or references to Tang Dynasty classics, more colloquial language became the norm. Also, the above-mentioned structure of three lines generally stayed the same, rather than just writing one standalone sijo, modern sijo can go on for much longer and in most cases often does so. On top of this, although there was never a standard syllable count for p’yǒng sijo, in general each foot seem to be shorter than those in modern sijo. Overall, modern sijo became more free in style and departed in many ways from p’yǒng sijo.

Writers

 Choe Nam-sǒn (최남선) who created the first book of modern sijo titled ‘백팔번뇌’ or the ‘108 Worldly Desires’ in 1926. Not only was he a poet, he also published magazines during Japanese occupation to educate the young people. “In the mid-1920s to mid-1930s, he traveled across the homeland from Mount Paekdu down to Mount Chiri and sailed to Cheju Island, expressing his love to all the mountains and rivers and composing Sijo poems for Donga Ilbo along with his travelogues. He also compiled all Hyangga, Gasa and Sijo poems from the Three Kingdoms to Koyro and down to the Joseon Dynasties” (TheKoreaTimes). 
 Yi Kwang-su (이광수) was a Korean writer as well as independence and nationalist activist. His pennames included both Chunwon and Goju. 
 Jeong Inpo (정인보) was a Korean scholar, historian, journalist, politician and writer during the Japanese colonial era. 
 Yi Eunsang (이은상) is a South Korean poet, historian and holds a doctorate in literature. They are also the author of “노산 시조집”. 
 Yi Byeonggi (이병기) is regarded as one of the founders and writers of sijo.
 Yi Hou (이호우) was a South Korean poet and journalist and was most known for their emotional reserve and concern with reality as they wrote about rural life and its simplicity and beauty.

Examples

This poem was written by Yi Byeonggi (1891–1968), a well-known author who encouraged the creation of sijo. His work is often referred to as "gentle". This poem, "Orchid", has a traditional moral approach about flowers and is maintained in a modern idiom (Rutt, 260). He mentioned that sijo should convey modern life by the extension of the structure from the conventional single stanza to two or more.

Examples
Sijo, unlike some other East Asian poetic forms, frequently employs metaphors, puns, allusions and similar word play. Most poets follow these guidelines very closely although there are longer examples. An exemplar is this poem by Yun Seondo (1587–1671) :

Yun Seondo also wrote a famous collection of forty sijo of the changing seasons through the eyes of a fisherman. Following is the first verse from the Spring sequence; notice the added refrains in lines 2 and 4.

Either narrative or thematic, this lyric verse introduces a situation or problem in line 1, development (called a turn) in line 2, and a strong conclusion beginning with a surprise (a twist) in line 3, which resolves tensions or questions raised by the other lines and provides a memorable ending.

Korean poetry can be traced at least as far back as 17 BC with King Yuri's Song of Yellow Birds but its roots are in earlier Korean culture (op. cit., Rutt, 1998, "Introduction"). Sijo, Korea's favorite poetic genre, is often traced to Confucian monks of the eleventh century, but its roots, too, are in those earlier forms. One of its peaks occurred as late as the 16th and 17th centuries under the Joseon Dynasty. One poem of the sijo genre is from the 14th century:

Sijo is, first and foremost, a song. This lyric pattern gained popularity in royal courts amongst the yangban as a vehicle for religious or philosophical expression, but a parallel tradition arose among the commoners. Sijo were sung or chanted with musical accompaniment, and this tradition survives. The word originally referred only to the music, but it has come to be identified with the lyrics.

Note: The English adaptations of verses by Yun Seondo and U Tak are by Larry Gross (op. cit.) The English adaptation of the verse by Hwang Jin-i is by David R. McCann (op. cit.); Some of the information on the origins of sijo are cited from The Bamboo Grove: An Introduction to Sijo, ed. Richard Rutt (U. of Michigan Press, 1998); Kichung Kim's An Introduction to Classical Korean Literature: From Hyangga to P'ansori; and Peter H. Lee.

Contemporary sijo
In South Korea today, sijo is widely considered to be a dead art-form, to the point that there are more sijo written in the U.S. today than in South Korea.

In English
In 1986 the journal Poet dedicated an issue to "classic" Korean sijo translated into English by Korean-American Kim Unsong (aka William Kim). This was followed by Kim's Classical Korean Poems (Sijo) in 1987, Sijo by Korean Poets in China, and Poems of Modern Sijo (a collection of his originals) in the mid-1990s. They found a devoted audience in American theWORDshop publisher Dr. Larry Gross and Canadian haiku poet Elizabeth St. Jacques. As a result, a volume of original English-language sijo (Around the Tree of Light) by St. Jacques appeared and soon after, Gross launched the first issue of Sijo West with St. Jacques as assistant editor. It was the world's first poetry journal dedicated to English-language sijo and caught on well with poets dedicated to haiku and other forms of Asian verse.

Sijo West folded in 1999 reportedly due to health problems and tragedies with Gross. St. Jacques reemerged with online postings known as Sijo Blossoms (circa 2001), which, apparently, has since evolved into the Sijo In The Light section of her Poetry In The Light website. Sijo In The Light, like the defunct Sijo West, featured original English-language sijo, as well as essays and reviews. Gross, meanwhile, has maintained a significant presence for sijo on his website Poetry in theWORDshop, which includes translations from Korean masters as well as original contributions by contemporary poets. Gross moderated a Yahoo! discussion group, sijoforum.

Urban Temple, a collection of sijo composed in English by the Harvard University Emeritus Professor David McCann is available from Bo-Leaf Books. Nominated for the Griffin Poetry Prize, this collection was praised by Jane Shore as "at once present and universal, contemporary and timeless ... a book well worth waiting for." Sijo: an international journal of poetry and song is published by the Cambridge Institute for the Study of Korea and volumes 1 and 2 are currently available. For Nirvana: 108 Zen Sijo Poems by Musan Cho Oh-Hyun was translated by Heinz Insu Fenkl and published by Columbia University Press in 2017. The page Sijo Poet on Facebook shares sijo composed in English as well as poems translated from Korean.

See also

 Korean culture
 Korean poetry
 Hyangga

Notes

References and further reading
 The Bamboo Grove: An Introduction to Sijo, ed. Richard Rutt, University of Michigan Press, 1998.
 Soaring Phoenixes and Prancing Dragons; A Historical Survey of Korean Classical Literature, by James Hoyt, Korean Studies Series No. 20, Jimoondang International, 2000.
 Master Sijo Poems from Korea: Classical and Modern, selected and translated by Jaihun Joyce Kim, Si-sa-yong-o-sa Publishers, Inc., 1982.
 An Introduction to Classical Korean Literature: From Hyangga to P'ansori by Kichung Kim, Armonk, N.Y.: M.E. Sharpe, 1996.
 Early Korean Literature, David R. McCann, ed., Columbia University Press, 2000.
 The Columbia Anthology of Traditional Korean Poetry, Peter H. Lee, editor, Columbia University Press, 2002.
 The Book of Korean Shijo, translated and edited by Kevin O'Rourke, Harvard East Asian Monographs 215, Harvard-Ewha Series on Korea, Harvard University Asia Center, 2002.
 Jeet Kune Do'nun Felsefesi, Yüksel Yılmaz, İstanbul, Turkey: Yalın Yayıncılık, (2008).
For Nirvana: 108 Zen Sijo Poems,Musan Cho Oh-hyun, translated by Heinz Insu Fenkl, Columbia University Press, 2016.

External links
Hwang Chini's most famous sijo
Sijo Poetry

Poetic forms
Korean poetry